Charles Alan Dyer is an American convicted child rapist and a former Marine sergeant who operated as an advocate for the Oath Keepers. Dyer was charged in 2010 with child rape and illegal weapons possession. Dyer evaded authorities and a manhunt ensued, followed by capture ten days later. In 2012, Dyer was convicted of raping his seven-year-old daughter.

Oath Keeper involvement 
Dyer began producing YouTube videos in support of the Oath Keepers under the handle July4Patriot. Dyer at times recorded these videos in Marine Corps dress uniform and always wore a mask emblazoned with a grinning skull. Dyer said he wore the mask to protect his identity. Dyer warned that military urban warfare drills were in fact being used to prepare American soldiers to incarcerate citizens. Dyer's videos became viral in the Patriot and Oath Keeper subculture, several accumulating hundreds of thousands of views and thousands of comments.

Dyer revealed his identity at an April 29, 2010 Tea Party event in Lexington, Massachusetts. He was among the most prominent Oath Keepers members at the time.

Following news of the alleged crimes, the Oath Keepers distanced themselves from Dyer. Oath Keepers founder Stewart Rhodes wrote on their website that Dyer had never been offered a leadership position and in fact had never been a member. The American Conservative notes that this attempt to sever ties was not very effective. The group removed a notice that Dyer would "represent" the Oath Keepers at a Tea Party movement rally. Though the Conservative disputes the account of Dyer's involvement as showing a problem with the Oath Keepers as an organization, it notes that "Dyer was clearly associated with Rhodes's group [the Oath Keepers]" and "if Dyer is guilty of the weapons charge, that might seem to support the position that the Oath Keeper worldview encourages insurrectionary force".

Criminal charges

Initial charges
On January 21, 2010, Dyer was arrested by Stephens County sheriff deputies in his home in Marlow, Oklahoma. He was charged with rape and forced sodomy of his 7-year-old daughter. A search of his home revealed that he possessed a 40mm grenade launcher and several firearms, resulting in an additional count of possession of an unregistered military weapon.

Manhunt 
Prior to his August 15 court date, Dyer ran from the authorities, hiding in Texas until capture ten days later at a campground southwest of Houston. Given a video by Dyer telling authorities of his intent to arm himself if they appeared at his home, law enforcement was concerned about the possibility of violence in their pursuit. They found Dyer's mobile home burned when they came to his property, and followers and friends of Dyer posted videos describing their intent to help Dyer evade capture. Residents of Pecan Grove, Texas notified authorities of a strange man near a day care centre, leading police to find Dyer. Dyer told police that he had been hiding in brush near a creek for five or six days.

Trial
Dyer was part of three trials, the first two of which were dismissed as mistrials in January 2010 and April 2011. He faced six charges, including kidnapping and second degree rape by instrumentation. In Dyer's third trial, the judge ordered that media and photography of the jury panel be prohibited.

In April 2012, Dyer was convicted of the rape of his daughter. He was sentenced to 30 years' imprisonment. The conviction followed two prior mistrials. Judge Joe Enos presided over the trial. Following the conviction, Stephens County Sheriff McKinney described the "circus-like sideshows" that Dyer brought to the courtroom, including statements on his political views and his idea that the "prosecution was a government conspiracy". The trial took three days, and the jury deliberated for three hours before producing the guilty verdict.

Sources 

Living people
American people convicted of rape
American people convicted of child sexual abuse
Year of birth missing (living people)
Members of the Oath Keepers
Prisoners and detainees of Oklahoma